was a Japanese professional sumo wrestler. He was the sport's 27th yokozuna from 1918 until 1925. Generally he is considered one of the pioneers of modern sumo. He remains the lightest yokozuna in the history of the sport with a weight of 104 kg.

Early career
He entered sumo in February 1911, using the shikona  until changing the given name to Moriya in January 1914. His coach Hitachiyama Taniemon did not expect him to be strong owing to his light weight. However, Tochigiyama lost only 3 bouts on his way to the top makuuchi division, achieving promotion in January 1915. Tochigiyama defeated Tachiyama Mineemon, ending his series of 56 victories, on the 8th day of the May 1916 tournament.

Tochigiyama was promoted to ōzeki in May 1917. After he won his first two championships at ōzeki without suffering a single defeat, he was promoted to yokozuna in February 1918.

Yokozuna
Tochigiyama won a third championship during his first tournament as yokozuna. He also won the following two tournaments, meaning he achieved five consecutive championships between May 1917 and May 1919.

Tochigiyama defeated other wrestlers with his strong oshi, or pushing techniques. He compensated for his lack of weight by training extremely hard. He was nicknamed the "little giant yokozuna". Like Hitachiyama before him, he trained many wrestlers, such as later yokozuna Tamanishiki San'emon, even though they were not members of the Dewanoumi stable.

In May 1925, he suddenly retired after winning three consecutive championships between January 1924 and January 1925. Asked about his retirement, he stated that he wanted to retire while still a strong opponent.

The painter Foujita made his portrait in sumotori in 1926 in Paris; the painting is kept in the musée de Grenoble (France).

Tochigiyama only lost 23 times while an active sumo wrestler in the top makuuchi division, and only eight times during his seven years as yokozuna. His top division winning percentage was 87.8. In addition, his winning percentage as yokozuna reached 93.5, the fourth best in history after Jinmaku, Tachiyama and Tanikaze.

Retirement from sumo

After his retirement, he was permitted to leave Dewanoumi stable and become the eighth head coach of Kasugano stable. He was the adopted son of its previous head coach, referee Kimura Soshiro. In his tenure, Tochigiyama produced yokozuna Tochinishiki Kiyotaka.

In June 1931, Tochigiyama took part in the first , special sumo tournament. To the surprise of many, he defeated Tamanishiki and Tenryū, and won the championship. In the modern age, retired wrestlers can no longer take part in any special sumo tournaments.

In 1952 he performed his kanreki dohyō-iri or '60th year ring entrance ceremony' to commemorate his years as yokozuna. His strength hardly declined long into his retirement. It is reported that Tochigiyama in his sixties easily carried a large hibachi which none of his other junior stable members could move.

He died suddenly in 1959 whilst still in charge of Kasugano stable. Tochinishiki, who Tochigiyama had in turn adopted as his son, took over as head coach of the stable.

Career record

See also
Glossary of sumo terms
Kanreki dohyō-iri
List of past sumo wrestlers
List of sumo tournament top division champions
List of yokozuna

References

External links

Tochigiyama Moriya 

1892 births
1959 deaths
Japanese sumo wrestlers
Yokozuna
Sumo people from Tochigi Prefecture